Caenurgia adusta  is a species of moth of the family Erebidae. It is found in the Caribbean, including the Dominican Republic and Haiti.

References

Moths described in 1865
Caenurgia